Hebeloma clavulipes is a species of mushroom in the family Hymenogastraceae. It was described as new to science in 1965 by French mycologist Henri Romagnesi.

See also
List of Hebeloma species

References

clavulipes
Fungi described in 1965
Fungi of Europe